Fr. Thomas Fogarty (born 1951) is a Roman Catholic priest and former hurler who played as a left corner-back at senior level for the Tipperary county team.

Born in Templetuohy, County Tipperary, Fogarty first played competitive hurling in his youth. attended Thurles CBS, and trained for the priesthood at St. Patrick's College, Thurles and was ordained for the Diocese of Cashel and Emly.

Hurling career
He arrived on the inter-county scene at the age of seventeen when he first linked up with the Tipperary minor teams as a dual player before later joining the under-21 hurling side. He joined the senior panel during the 1975 championship. Fogarty was an unused substitute during his career and ended his playing days without silverware.

At club level Fogarty was a one-time championship medallist with Moyne–Templetuohy.

Fogarty retired from inter-county hurling following the conclusion of the 1976 championship.

In retirement from playing Fogarty became involved in team management and coaching. After acting as coach and selector with the Tipperary minor and under-21 teams he later managed both Tipperary and Offaly.

Honours

Player
Moyne–Templetuohy 
Tipperary Senior Hurling Championship (1): 1971

St Patrick's College, Thurles
Higher Education Hurling League (Runners Up) : 1976

Manager
Galway
Munster Under-21 Hurling Championship (1): 1972

Academic and clerical career
Fr. Fogarty B.A., M.A., has served as the  president of St. Patrick's College, Thurles since May 2004, having been a lecturer in Pastoral Theology, and Vice-President of St. Patrick's College from 1993 to 1995. Diocesan Secretary and Chancellor of the Archdiocese of Cashel and Emly from 1989–1997. He has presided over St. Patrick's College, Thurles, as it developed into a College of Education, developing links with the Tipperary Institute, the University of Limerick and now to its incorporation into Mary Immaculate College.

Publications
 Celebrating the Spirit in our Midst: Spirituality for our Times Published by St. Patrick's College, Thurles, 2005.
"Has Sport replaced Religion?",  Intercom, published by Veritas Group, May 2009;
"Is Sport the new Religion?", Intercom, published by Veritas Group, June 2009.

References

1951 births
Living people
Moyne-Templetuohy hurlers
Tipperary inter-county hurlers
Tipperary inter-county Gaelic footballers
Hurling managers
Alumni of St. Patrick's College, Thurles
Dual players
20th-century Irish Roman Catholic priests